Red Courage is a lost 1921 American silent Western film directed by B. Reeves Eason and featuring Hoot Gibson.

Plot
As described in a film magazine, Pinto Peters (Gibson) and his pal Chuckwalla Bill (Day) ride into town just as the editor of the local newspaper is being urged to leave by a gang of thugs led by Joe Reedly (Girard). The pair give the editor $100 and get a bill of sale for the newspaper, only to find out later that Reedly holds a mortgage of $200 against it. This they pay off and start a campaign to clean up the town. They meet with considerable opposition until they enlist the services of Judge Fay (Cummings). When Pinto runs for sheriff and defeats the tool of Reedly, everything is smooth sailing. The crooks are run out of town, money that was about to be stolen is restored to Jane (Malone), the ward of Reedly, and Pinto after several hard fights wins her hand.

Cast
 Hoot Gibson as Pinto Peters
 Joel Day as Chuckwalla Bill
 Molly Malone as Jane Reedly
 Joseph W. Girard as Joe Reedly (credited as Joe Girard)
 Merrill McCormick as Percy Gibbons (credited as William Merrill McCormick)
 Charles Newton as Tom Caldwell
 Arthur Hoyt as Nathan Hitch
 Joe Harris as Blackie Holloway
 Richard Cummings as Judge Fay (credited as Dick Cummings)
 Mary Philbin as Eliza Fay
 Jim Corey as Steve Carrol
 Mack V. Wright as Sam Waters (credited as Mac V. Wright)

See also
 Hoot Gibson filmography

References

External links

 
 

1921 films
1921 lost films
1921 Western (genre) films
American black-and-white films
Films directed by B. Reeves Eason
Lost Western (genre) films
Lost American films
Silent American Western (genre) films
Universal Pictures films
1920s American films